MIRT may refer to:

 Mobile Infrared Transmitter, a device used by buses and emergency vehicles to control traffic lights
 Mario in Real-Time, a digital puppetry system by Nintendo